Roman Vorobey (born 7 June 1995 in Volyn Oblast, Ukraine) is a Ukrainian football defender.

Career
Vorobey is a product of his native FC Volyn Lutsk youth sportive school system.

He played in the Ukrainian Premier League Reserves for FC Volyn and the different Ukrainian amateur clubs. In August 2017, Vorobey signed again a contract with FC Volyn

References

External links
 Profile at FFU Official Site (Ukr)
 

1995 births
Living people
Ukrainian footballers
FC Volyn Lutsk players
Association football defenders